Miche Braden (born November 14, 1953) is a jazz singer and theatrical performer known for her on-stage portrayals of Bessie Smith and Billie Holiday. Braden, who is originally from Detroit, originated the Bessie Smith role and has been performing it since 2000 in ‘The Devil’s Music: The Life and Blues of Bessie Smith’. Braden has been called "the biggest force of nature this side of Hurricane Harvey." She has performed in the musical nationwide, including an off-Broadway run in 2001 and again in 2011, as well as acting as the musical director and writing songs. She was nominated for a Helen Hayes award for her performance in 2018.

Personal life

Braden was born in Detroit, Michigan, and attended Mackenzie High School and Cooley High School. She later attended Michigan State University. While in Detroit, Braden was an artist in residence with the Detroit Council of the Arts. She also founded a women's jazz band called Straight Ahead. She describes herself as a protégé of Motown musicians Thomas "Beans" Bowles, Earl Van Dyke and jazz master composer Harold McKinney.

References

1953 births
Living people
20th-century American singers
African-American women singer-songwriters
20th-century American women singers
20th-century African-American women singers
21st-century African-American people
21st-century African-American women
American women jazz singers
American jazz singers